Laurence A. Soderblom (born 1944) is a geophysicist with the Astrogeology Science center at the United States Geological Survey in Flagstaff, Arizona where he has served as Chief of the Branch of Astrogeology. Soderblom is best known for his work in imaging science.

He earned Bachelor of Science degrees in geology and physics from the New Mexico Institute of Mining and Technology and a PhD in planetary science and geophysics from Caltech.

Soderblom has been involved in several JPL planetary missions.  As an Associate Investigator on the Mariner 6, 7, and Mariner 9, and Viking program teams. He is best known for his leadership in imaging science on the Voyager, Magellan, Galileo, Mars Global Surveyor, Mars Pathfinder, and Mars Exploration Rovers.  He also served on the science teams of the Deep Space 1 and Cassini–Huygens missions. He has participated in missions ranging from Venus to Neptune and each of the planets in between.

Soderblom has also appeared on Cosmos: A Personal Voyage and The Planets (1999) discussing his work with the Voyager team.

Honors and awards 
 During 1983-84 he was a Sherman Fairchild Distinguished Scholar at Caltech. 
 2014 Whipple Award for outstanding contribution to planetary science

References

External links 

1944 births
Living people
Astrogeologists
Planetary scientists